Haplopharyngomyia is a genus of fly in the family Dolichopodidae. It is known from Thailand.

It was originally named Haplopharynx by H.J.G. Grootaert and Patrick Meuffels in 1998. Later, the same two authors found this name to be preoccupied by the flatworm genus Haplopharynx (Meixner, 1938), so it was renamed to Haplopharyngomyia in 1999.

Species
Haplopharyngomyia mutilus (Grootaert & Meuffels, 1998)
Haplopharyngomyia phangngensis (Grootaert & Meuffels, 1998)

References

Dolichopodidae
Dolichopodidae genera
Diptera of Asia
Insects of Thailand